Kalo Dungar or Black Hill is the highest point in Kutch, Gujarat, India, at .

This is probably the only place in Kachchh from where a panoramic view of the Great Rann of Kutch is possible. Since it is located very near to the Pakistan border, there is an Army post at the top; beyond here, only military personnel are allowed.

The Kalo Dungar is also famous for a 400-year-old Dattatreya temple. Kalo Dungar magnetic hill is a popular optical illusion where vehicle seems to defy the gravity and roll up the slope.

Etymology
The word Kalo Dungar means the Black Hill in Kutchi language, from the words Kalo for the Black and Dungar for the Hill.

Dattatreya temple
The Kalo Dungar is also famous for a 400-year-old Dattatreya temple. Legend says that when Dattatreya walked on the earth, he stopped at the Black Hills and found a band of starving jackals. Being a god, he offered them his body to eat and as they ate, his body continually regenerated itself. Because of this, for the last four centuries, the priest at the temple has prepared a batch of prasad, cooked rice, that is fed to the jackals after the evening aarti.

Another, legend has it that there was once a holy man named Lakkh Guru residing at Kala Dungar and worshiping the Lord Dattatreya. He used to feed wild jackals. There came a day when he found he had no food, so he cut off a part of his body and offered it to the jackals, saying, "Le ang!" ("take the body part"). Over the centuries, this got corrupted to "Long".

Gravity hill optical illusion 

Kalo Dungar magnetic hill or Kalo Dungar Anti Gravity slope is an hill road with optical illusion of a gravity hill where vehicle seems to defy the gravity and roll from down slope to up the slope. A strange phenomenon was observed at Kalo Dungar, when some visitors noticed that their vehicles would attain speeds over  driving down the hill even with the ignition switched off, a much higher velocity than descending other nearby peaks. A team of experts from the Gujarat State Disaster Management Authority (GSDMA); Institute of Seismological Research, Gandhinagar; and Indian Institute of Technology, Kanpur studied the phenomenon. It was concluded that the vehicles pick up speed because the slope is steeper than it appears to the traveller (see gravity hill).

Gallery

See also
Panchmai Pir

References

External links

Hills of Gujarat
Geography of Kutch district
Tourist attractions in Kutch district
Gravity hills